The Honourable Anna Elizabeth Blackstock Walker CB (born 1951) is a British senior civil servant and regulator of services. Walker is married to Timothy Walker, with whom she has three adult children. She is the daughter of Lord Butterworth.

Career
Walker succeeded Chris Bolt as chair of the Office of Rail Regulation on 5 July 2009 when Bolt's five-year term of office expired. In this role, Walker was the IRG-Rail Chair for 2013; the members of IRG-Rail consist of the independent Regulatory Bodies of twenty-one countries inside and outside the European Union. She stepped down from this role in 2015 and was replaced by Stephen Glaister.

She was Chief Executive of the Healthcare Commission from its formation on 1 April 2004 until 31 March 2009, when the commission was abolished and its functions in England were broadly subsumed by the Care Quality Commission.

2009–2016 Chair, Young Epilepsy
2009–2015 Chair, Office of Rail Regulation
2008–2012 Board member and vice chair, Consumer Focus
2004–2009 Chief Executive, Healthcare Commission
2001–2003 Director-General for Rural Affairs, Department for Environment, Food and Rural Affairs
1998–2001 Director-General for Energy, Department of Trade and Industry
1994–1997 Deputy Director-General, Oftel
1975–1994 Civil Servant, mostly at Department of Trade and Industry
1972–1973 British Council

Education
Lady Margaret Hall, Oxford (MA History)
Bryn Mawr College, US
Benenden School, Kent
Oxford High School

References

People educated at Benenden School
Living people
Daughters of life peers
Civil servants in the Department of Trade and Industry
Civil servants in the Department for Environment, Food and Rural Affairs
Companions of the Order of the Bath
Alumni of Lady Margaret Hall, Oxford
1951 births
People educated at Oxford High School, England